Sy is a given name, nickname and surname.

Sy or SY may also refer to:

Places:
 Sy, Belgium, a town in the Ardennes
 Sy, Ardennes, a commune in France
 Sy, Mali, a small town and commune
 1714 Sy, an asteroid

Codes:
 SY postcode area, the British post code area for Shrewsbury
 Syria's ISO 3166-1 country code
 .sy, the country code top level domain for Syria
 SY, Sun Country Airlines's IATA airline code
 SY, Sybase's New York Stock Exchange ticker symbol

Other uses:
 Sonic Youth, an American rock band
 Office of Security, a former name for the U.S. State Department's Diplomatic Security Service
 China Railways SY, a Chinese class of industrial 2-8-2 steam locomotive
 SY or S/Y, a ship prefix for sailing yacht or steam yacht

See also
 Cy (disambiguation)